Enigmogramma feisthamelii is a moth of the family Noctuidae. It is found in South America, including French Guiana.

Plusiinae